Claude James Wroten (born September 16, 1983) is a former American football defensive tackle. He was drafted by the St. Louis Rams in the third round of the 2006 NFL Draft. He played college football at Louisiana State.

He was suspended by the NFL after repeated violations of the league's substance abuse policy. He was waived by the Rams on March 3, 2010.  Wroten was re-instated by the NFL on August 23, 2010.

Early years
Wroten attended Bastrop High School in Bastrop, Louisiana.

College career

Mississippi Delta
Lettered twice at Mississippi Delta Community College, making 53 tackles, 15 sacks, three forced fumbles, and two fumble recoveries in 2003 before transferring to LSU.

LSU
Wroten was First-team All-SEC by College Football News and Second-team All-SEC by the Associated Press and the SEC Coaches. He played 12 games with nine starts. He recorded 44 tackles, 12 tackles for losses and 6 sacks. He had 3 tackles and 1 sack for an 8-yard loss against Iowa in the Capital One Bowl. As a senior in 2005 he was named First-team All-America by College Football News and Second-team All-America by the Sporting News and named First-team All-SEC by both the league's coaches and the AP. He played in 13 games with 12 starts. He had 49 tackles, 10.5 tackles for losses and 6 sacks and 26 quarterback hurries.

Professional career

Pre-draft

Wroten had a chance at being a first-round pick after LSU's season ended, then police stopped him for speeding in Sterlington, Louisiana, on January 4, 2006, and arrested him on charges of possession of marijuana with intent to distribute. However, the district attorney declined the case.

St. Louis Rams
Wroten was drafted by the St. Louis Rams in the third round of the 2006 NFL Draft. On July 25, Wroten signed a four-year, $2.415 million contract with the Rams. Wroten played 15 games as a rookie, totaling 13 tackles a sack and a forced fumble.

In 2007, Wroten recorded 13 tackles and a half-sack. He served a four-game suspension in 2007 for violation of the NFL substance abuse policy.

On July 23, 2008, Wroten was suspended without pay (he was due $445,000 salary) for the 2008 NFL season for his third violation the NFL's substance abuse policy. The Rams have asked suspended Wroten to return part of his rookie signing bonus, filing a grievance against Wroten, who received an $805,000 signing bonus his rookie contract. The Rams sought $201,250 back.

Florida Tuskers
Wroten was signed by the Florida Tuskers of the United Football League on August 17, 2009.

Toronto Argonauts
On April 21, 2011, Wroten was signed by the Toronto Argonauts of the Canadian Football League. Released by the Argonauts on June 17, 2012.

Edmonton Eskimos
Wroten signed with the Edmonton Eskimos on August 9, 2012.

Marion Blue Racers
Wroten signed with the Marion Blue Racers of the Continental Indoor Football League for the  season.

Orlando Predators
Wroten signed with the Orlando Predators of the Arena Football League on May 9, 2013.

Nebraska Danger
Wroten signed during the 2014 season with the Nebraska Danger of the Indoor Football League. On May 8, 2015, Wroten was released by the Danger.

References

External links
LSU Tigers bio
Toronto Argonauts bio
Nebraska Danger bio

1983 births
Living people
American football defensive tackles
Edmonton Elks players
Florida Tuskers players
LSU Tigers football players
Mississippi Delta Trojans football players
People from Bastrop, Louisiana
Players of American football from Louisiana
St. Louis Rams players
Toronto Argonauts players
Marion Blue Racers players
Orlando Predators players
Nebraska Danger players
Missouri Monsters players